Long Run Baptist Church and Cemetery (also known as the Lincoln Cabin Site) is a historic church and cemetery on Long Run Road in Eastwood, Kentucky.

In 1786 Captain Abraham Lincoln, grandfather of President Abraham Lincoln was murdered near this site by Native Americans, while President Lincoln's father, Thomas Lincoln, age eight, watched his father's murder. Tradition states that Captain Abraham Lincoln was buried by his cabin, which is now the site of Long Run Baptist Church and Cemetery.  A stone memorializing Captain Abraham Lincoln was placed in the cemetery in 1937.  The church was built on the site in 1844. The church and cemetery were added to the National Register of Historic Places in 1975.

References

External links
 
 
 

Churches completed in 1844
Baptist churches in Kentucky
Baptist cemeteries in the United States
Cemeteries on the National Register of Historic Places in Kentucky
Churches in Louisville, Kentucky
Local landmarks in Louisville, Kentucky
National Register of Historic Places in Louisville, Kentucky
Churches on the National Register of Historic Places in Kentucky
19th-century Baptist churches in the United States
19th-century buildings and structures in Louisville, Kentucky
1844 establishments in Kentucky
Lincoln family